Omosita colon is a species of sap-feeding beetle in the family Nitidulidae. It is found in Europe and Northern Asia (excluding China), Central America, and North America.

References

Further reading

 

Nitidulidae
Articles created by Qbugbot
Beetles described in 1758
Taxa named by Carl Linnaeus